Catoctin Mountain Park, located in north-central Maryland, is part of the forested Catoctin Mountain ridge−range that forms the northeastern rampart of the Blue Ridge Mountains, in  the Appalachian Mountains System.

Catoctin Mountain Park is managed by the National Park Service, and lies north of and directly adjacent to the similarly-sized Cunningham Falls State Park.

History
In the 1930s, after years of making charcoal to fuel nearby iron furnaces, mountain farming, and harvesting of trees for timber, land was purchased to be transformed into a productive recreation area, helping to put people back to work during the Great Depression. Beginning in 1935, the Catoctin Recreational Demonstration Area was under construction by both the Works Progress Administration and the Civilian Conservation Corps.  The northern portion of the park was transferred to the National Park Service on November 14, 1936, and renamed and reorganized on July 12, 1954, with the southern  transferred to Maryland as Cunningham Falls State Park.

Bills were introduced in the United States Senate in 2003 and 2005 to re-designate the park as Catoctin Mountain National Recreation Area. The bills passed the Senate, but were not taken up by the House, and therefore did not become law.  The park was listed on the National Register of Historic Places in 2014.

Originally planned to provide recreational camps for federal employees, one of the camps eventually became the home of the Presidential retreat, Camp David. The Presidential retreat is not open or accessible to the public; however, the eastern hardwood forest of Catoctin Mountain Park does have many other attractions for visitors, some of which include camping, picnicking, fishing,  of hiking trails, and scenic mountain vistas.

See also 

 Catoctin Mountain
 Catoctin Trail
 Camp Misty Mount Historic District
 Camp Greentop Historic District

References

 The National Parks: Index 2001–2003. Washington: U.S. Department of the Interior.

External links

 NPS web site for Catoctin Mountain Park
 Camp Misty Mount: A Place for Regrowth, a National Park Service Teaching with Historic Places (TwHP) lesson plan
, including boundary map, at Maryland Historical Trust website

Parks in Frederick County, Maryland
National Park Service areas in Maryland
Blue Ridge Mountains
Historic districts in Maryland
National Register of Historic Places in Frederick County, Maryland
Parks on the National Register of Historic Places in Maryland
Protected areas established in 1954
1954 establishments in Maryland
Civilian Conservation Corps in Maryland
Works Progress Administration in Maryland
National Park Service Rustic architecture